Live in Nashville, TN is a live album by the band King Crimson, released through the King Crimson Collectors' Club in February 2002.

Track listing
"Dangerous Curves" (Adrian Belew, Robert Fripp, Trey Gunn, Pat Mastelotto) 4:52
"Level Five" (Belew, Fripp, Gunn, Mastelotto) 7:50
"the construKction of light" (Belew, Fripp, Gunn, Mastelotto) 8:49
"ProzaKc Blues" (Belew, Fripp, Gunn, Mastelotto) 5:58
"Elektrik" (Belew, Fripp, Gunn, Mastelotto) 8:13
"Thela Hun Ginjeet"  (Belew, Bill Bruford, Fripp, Tony Levin) 5:46
"Virtuous Circle" (Belew, Fripp, Gunn, Mastelotto) 7:04
"Elephant Talk" (Belew, Bruford, Fripp, Levin) 4:16
"Larks' Tongues in Aspic (Part IV)" (Belew, Fripp, Gunn, Mastelott) 10:30
"The Deception of the Thrush" (Belew, Fripp, Gunn) 8:09
"Red" (Fripp) 5:42

Personnel
Robert Fripp - guitar
Adrian Belew - guitar, vocals
Trey Gunn - Warr guitar
Pat Mastelotto - drums

References

2002 live albums
Fan-club-release albums
King Crimson Collector's Club albums